Argengau was a territory of Alemannia within East Francia in the 8th and 9th centuries, being a county in the 9th century, and of the Duchy of Swabia in the 10th. It was situated north of Lake Constance, comprising Lindau.
It was named for the Argen river.

Notes

Geography of Baden-Württemberg